Kaira alba, the pale frilled orbweaver, is a species of orb weaver in the family Araneidae. It is found in the US and Mexico.

References

Further reading

 
 
 

Araneidae
Spiders described in 1850